Kraków Mydlniki is a railway station in the Bronowice district of Kraków, Poland, located in the neighbourhood of Mydlniki, northwest of the city centre. The station, with its historic building, lies within the Tenczynek Landscape Park (Tenczyński Park Krajobrazowy) protected area with numerous summer visitors, because the Park is also the location of a medieval Tenczyn Castle built as a seat of the powerful Tęczyński family. It fell into ruin during the Deluge in mid-17th century, after being pillaged and burned by Swedish-Brandenburgian forces looking for the Polish Crown Jewels and the rumored treasures of the Tęczyński family. Within the Landscape Park are five nature reserves.

The station serves the PKP rail line 95 between Katowice to the west (1), and Kraków Balice to the east (2); more specifically:
 PKP rail line 133 Dąbrowa Górnicza Ząbkowice - Kraków Główny, 
 PKP rail line 118 Kraków Mydlniki - Kraków Balice, .

References

Mydlniki
Railway stations in Lesser Poland Voivodeship